The men's shot put at the 1954 European Athletics Championships was held in Bern, Switzerland, at Stadion Neufeld on 27 August 1954.

Medalists

Results

Final
27 August

Qualification
27 August

Participation
According to an unofficial count, 24 athletes from 15 countries participated in the event.

 (1)
 (2)
 (2)
 (2)
 (2)
 (1)
 (2)
 (1)
 (1)
 (2)
 (2)
 (2)
 (1)
 (2)
 (1)

References

Shot put
Shot put at the European Athletics Championships